Maria Seweryn (born 25 March 1975) is a Polish actress. She appeared in more than ten films since 1980. Seweryn is the daughter of actors Krystyna Janda and Andrzej Seweryn.

Selected filmography

References

External links 

1975 births
Living people
Polish film actresses